The 1975 Montreal Expos season was the seventh season in the history of the franchise. The Expos finished in last place in the National League East with a record of 75–87, 17½ games behind the Pittsburgh Pirates.

Offseason
 December 4, 1974: Tom Walker and Terry Humphrey were traded to the Detroit Tigers for Woodie Fryman.
 December 4, 1974: Mike Torrez and Ken Singleton were traded to the Baltimore Orioles for Dave McNally, Rich Coggins, and Bill Kirkpatrick (minors).
 December 5, 1974: Willie Davis was traded to the Texas Rangers for Don Stanhouse and Pete Mackanin.

Spring training
The Expos held spring training at City Island Ball Park in Daytona Beach, Florida, their third season there.

Regular season

Season standings

Record vs. opponents

Opening Day lineup

Notable transactions
 April 30: Tim Ireland was released by the Expos.
 June 3: 1975 Major League Baseball Draft
Mike Boddicker was selected in the 8th round, but did not sign.
Andre Dawson was selected in the 11th round.
 June 15: Nate Colbert was purchased from the Detroit Tigers.

Roster

Player stats

Batting

Starters by position
Note: Pos = Position; G = Games played; AB = At bats; R = Runs scored; H = Hits; Avg. = Batting average; HR = Home runs; RBI = Runs batted in; SB = Stolen bases

Other batters
Note: G = Games played; AB = At bats; R = Runs scored; H = Hits; Avg. = Batting average; HR = Home runs; RBI = Runs batted in; SB = Stolen bases

Pitching

Starting pitchers
Note: G = Games pitched; IP = Innings pitched; W = Wins; L = Losses; ERA = Earned run average; SO = Strikeouts

Other pitchers
Note: G = Games pitched; IP = Innings pitched; W = Wins; L = Losses; ERA = Earned run average; SO = Strikeouts

Relief pitchers
Note: G = Games pitched; W = Wins; L = Losses; SV = Saves; ERA = Earned run average; SO = Strikeouts

Award winners

1975 Major League Baseball All-Star Game
 Gary Carter, catcher, reserve

Farm system

Notes

References

 1975 Montreal Expos team page at Baseball Reference
 1975 Montreal Expos team page at www.baseball-almanac.com
 

Montreal Expos seasons
Montreal Expos season
1970s in Montreal
1975 in Quebec